The giraffe is a long-necked ruminant of the African savannah, the tallest living land animal.

Giraffe may also refer to:
Giraffe (novel), a novel by J. M. Ledgard
Giraffe (album), an album by Echoboy
Giraffe (chess), a fairy chess piece
USS Giraffe (IX-118) 
Giraffe constellation or Camelopardalis
GIRAFFE Radar, a family of radar-based air defense and surveillance systems
Giraffe Restaurants, a United Kingdom restaurant and cafe chain
Meschugge or The Giraffe, a 1998 German thriller film by Dani Despecito.

See also
 Giraffes? Giraffes!, an instrumental math-rock band formed in Massachusetts
 The Giraffes (disambiguation)